Jean Cory Beall (23 May, 1909 – 26 October, 1978) was an American artist.

Her work is included in the collection of the Seattle Art Museum.

Education
Beall studied at the California College of Arts and Crafts, Parsons School of Design in Paris, France, the Institute Politecnico in Mexico City and the Art Students' League in New York City.

Public works
In 1957 Beall created Water into Electricity (That Man May Use It Freely...), a 37 foot long mosaic in glass tile for the City Light building in Seattle. The mural was moved to Seattle's Museum of History and Industry in 1996.

In 1959 she created a 10.5 foot by 29.5 foot long mural for the General Administration Building in Olympia, Washington. Created from Venetian glass tesserae, the mosaic was moved to the Washington State's Helen Sommers building next door in 2018.

References

1909 births
1978 deaths
20th-century American women artists